Euperipatoides kanangrensis is a species of velvet worm of the Peripatopsidae family, described in 1996 from specimens collected in Kanangra-Boyd National Park, New South Wales. This species has 15 pairs of legs in both sexes. It is endemic to Australia. The embryonic development of Euperipatoides kanangrensis has been described. This species is viviparous. This species is used as model organism for the last common ancestor of the Panarthropoda. It resembles fossil Cambrian lobopodians.

References

Further reading 

 
 
 
 
 
 

Onychophorans of Australasia
Onychophoran species
Animals described in 1996
Taxa named by Amanda Reid (malacologist)